Saint Paulinus may refer to:

Paulinus of Antioch, first Bishop of Lucca
Paulinus of Nola, or Pontius Meropius Anicius Paulinus
Paulinus of Trier (died 358), bishop of Trier and a supporter of Athanasius in the conflict with Arianism
Paulinus of York, first Archbishop of York
Paulinus II of Aquileia, Patriarchate of Aquileia
Paul Aurelian or Paulinus Aurelianus, 6th-century Welshman who became first bishop of the See of Léon and one of the seven founder saints of Brittany